State Route 9 (SR 9) is a north–south route running through four counties in east central Ohio. The southern terminus is at SR 148 in Armstrongs Mills and the northern terminus is with US 62 north of Salem.

Route description

History

before 1931 – Route 9 ran from Cincinnati to Michigan. This highway followed the current U.S. Highway 127 from the Ohio River at Cincinnati to just south of Bryan and followed current Ohio State Route 15 northward to the Michigan state line.
1935 – New incarnation of route 9 certified; Originally routed from Malaga to Salem along current routes 145, 148, and 9.
1938 – Southern end truncated to Armstrongs Mills.

Major intersections

References

External links

009
Transportation in Belmont County, Ohio
Transportation in Carroll County, Ohio
Transportation in Columbiana County, Ohio
Transportation in Harrison County, Ohio